Walter Hampden Dougherty (June 30, 1879 in Brooklyn – June 11, 1955 in Los Angeles), known professionally as Walter Hampden, was an American actor and theatre manager. He was a major stage star on Broadway in New York  who also made numerous television and film appearances.

Life and career 

Walter Hampden was the son of John Hampden Dougherty and Alice Hill. He was a younger brother of the American painter Paul Dougherty. He went to England for apprenticeship for six years. He graduated from what is now NYU Poly in 1900. Under Otho Stuart and Oscar Asche's co-management of the Adelphi Theatre in 1904 he appeared in The Prayer of the Sword and The Taming of the Shrew. Later he played Hamlet, Henry V and Cyrano de Bergerac on Broadway. In 1925, he became actor-manager at the Colonial Theatre on Broadway, which was renamed Hampden's Theatre from 1925 to 1931. He became noted for his Shakespearean roles as well as for Cyrano, which he played in several productions between 1923 and 1936. He appeared on the cover of Time in March 1929. Hampden's last stage role was as Danforth in the original Broadway production of Arthur Miller's The Crucible.

John Garrett Underhill produced the first English-language version of The Bonds of Interest (Los intereses creados) by Jacinto Benavente, with Walter Hampden, in 1929.

Hampden appeared in a few silent films, but did not really begin his film career in earnest until 1939, when he played the good Archdeacon (Frollo's brother) in The Hunchback of Notre Dame, starring Charles Laughton as Quasimodo. This was Hampden's first sound film; he was 60 at the time he made it. Several other roles followed—Jarvis Langdon in the 1944 film The Adventures of Mark Twain among them, but all were supporting character roles, not the lead roles that Hampden played onstage. He was the master of ceremonies at the Sarah Siddons Awards in All About Eve (1950), and he played the father of Humphrey Bogart and William Holden in Billy Wilder's 1954 comedy Sabrina. These last two films are arguably those for which Hampden is most well known to modern audiences. He also played long-bearded patriarchs in the Biblical epics The Silver Chalice (1954, as Joseph of Arimathea) and The Prodigal (1955).

Hampden reprised his portrayal of Cyrano de Bergerac in the first episode of the radio program Great Scenes from Great Plays, which Hampden hosted from 1948 to 1949. In addition to his radio roles (The Adventures of Leonidas Witherall), Hampden also appeared in several dramas during the early days of television. He made his TV debut in 1949, playing Macbeth for the last time at the age of 69. In 1951 he portrayed Captain Fairfax in a televised version of Louis O. Coxe and Robert H. Chapman's 1951 play Billy Budd for the anthology series Schlitz Playhouse of Stars.

His last role was the non-singing one of King Louis XI of France, considered by some to be one of his best performances, in the otherwise unremarkable 1956 Technicolor remake of Rudolf Friml's 1925 operetta The Vagabond King. It was released posthumously, more than a year after Hampden's death.

For 27 years, Walter Hampden was president of the Players' Club. The club's library is named for him.

His ashes are buried at The Evergreen Cemetery in Brooklyn, New York.

Personal life
Hampden married actress Mabel Carrie Moore (1879-1978) on 17 July 1905. They had a son, Paul Hampden Dougherty, and a daughter, Mary Moore Dougherty.

Filmography

References

External links 

People from Ridgefield, Connecticut
American male Shakespearean actors
Vaudeville performers
American male television actors
American male film actors
American male stage actors
Male actors from New York (state)
RCA Victor artists
1879 births
1955 deaths
20th-century American male actors
Polytechnic Institute of New York University alumni
Actor-managers